Alexander George Craig (1897–1973) was a British writer and poet, who wrote extensively about banned books.  Craig was interested more generally in sexual behaviour and reform, and was also engaged with the socialist movement.  He was involved with the Progressive League, reviewing books for their journal.

His papers are in the archives of Senate House Library.

Publications

Books
Banned Books of England 1937
Above All Liberties 1942
Sex and Revolution 1934
Memoranda of evidence submitted to the Select Committees of the House of Commons on obscene publications 1958
Banned Books of England and Other Countries.  A study of the conception of literary obscenity 1962
Suppressed books 1963

Articles
Outline of a Baudelaire bibliography 1945
Recent developments in the Law of Obscene Libel in England 1952
Bibliography of nudism 1954

Poetry
Aspirin Eaters 1943
Voice of Merlin 1946
Prometheans 1955

References

1897 births
1973 deaths
British non-fiction writers
English male poets
20th-century English poets
20th-century English male writers
20th-century non-fiction writers
Male non-fiction writers